The 1845 United States Senate election in Pennsylvania was held on January 14, 1845. Incumbent Daniel Sturgeon was re-elected by the Pennsylvania General Assembly to the United States Senate.

Results
The Pennsylvania General Assembly, consisting of the House of Representatives and the Senate, convened on January 14, 1845, to elect a Senator to serve the term beginning on March 4, 1845. The results of the vote of both houses combined are as follows:

|-
|-bgcolor="#EEEEEE"
| colspan="3" align="right" | Totals
| align="right" | 133
| align="right" | 100.00%
|}

See also 
 United States Senate elections, 1844 and 1845
 United States Senate special election in Pennsylvania, 1845

References

External links
Pennsylvania Election Statistics: 1682-2006 from the Wilkes University Election Statistics Project

1845
Pennsylvania
United States Senate
January 1845 events